The TKS spacecraft (Transport Supply Spacecraft, GRAU index 11F72) was a Soviet spacecraft conceived in the late 1960s for resupply flights to the military Almaz space station.

The spacecraft was designed for both crewed and autonomous uncrewed cargo resupply flights, but was never used operationally in its intended role – only four test missions were flown (including three that docked to Salyut space stations) during the program. The Functional Cargo Block (FGB) of the TKS spacecraft later formed the basis of several space station modules, including the Zarya FGB module on the International Space Station.

The TKS spacecraft consisted of two spacecraft mated together, both of which could operate independently:
 The VA spacecraft (known mistakenly in the West as the Merkur spacecraft), which would have housed the cosmonauts during launch and reentry of a TKS spacecraft, while traveling to and from an Almaz space station. 
 And the Functional Cargo Block (FGB) which, in order to resupply an Almaz space station, carried docking hardware, tanks, and a large pressurized cargo compartment. Furthermore, the FGB carried the on-orbit maneuvering engines for the TKS.

While the VA carried the reentry hardware, and only minimal life support and maneuvering systems, the FGB would have been used as the primary orbital maneuvering system and cargo storage for the TKS spacecraft.

The FGB could also be used alone as an uncrewed cargo module without a VA spacecraft, which enabled the FGB design to be re-purposed as FGB space station modules later on. The VA spacecraft, on the other hand, was also intended to be launched as "Almaz APOS", mated with an Almaz-OPS space station core as the primary orbital maneuvering system, instead of an FGB.

In the 2010s, Excalibur Almaz planned to use old VA capsules as low-cost cargo return vehicles. However, the company ultimately sold much of their equipment and announced that the remainder was to become an educational exhibit.

Design 

The TKS spacecraft was designed by Vladimir Chelomei (the VA capsule) and V. N. Bugayskiy (the FGB block) as a crewed spacecraft launched with Proton rocket alternative to the Soyuz spacecraft for use with Almaz space stations. Development began in 1965; the Almaz programme had been abandoned by the time the first TKS spacecraft flew in 1977.
The VA spacecraft ("Vozvrashaemiy Apparat") was flown separately on four test missions with two craft per launch to test the design, as well as one "all-up" test mission and three resupply missions.

The project had further evolved with space station "Modulny" ("Modular") based on the TKS design outline, reworked to dock with Salyut 7, Mir and ISS space stations. This development was designated FGB, or Functional Cargo Block.

The TKS spacecraft consisted of an 11F74 "Vozvraschaemyi Apparat" (or Return Vehicle commonly referred to as the VA), attached to an 11F77 "Transportniy Korabl Snabzheniya" (Functional/Cargo Block module or FGB).

TKS VA 

The TKS VA spacecraft was itself a very compact and efficient spacecraft. Typically it would reenter the atmosphere within 2 orbits, but could fly autonomously for up to 31 hours. The pressurized crew re-entry capsule was equipped with its own environmental control system, and topped with reaction control system, de-orbit braking engine, parachute system, and soft landing engines. Although extensively flight tested, it never flew with a crew on board.

The VA design was derived from the planned capsule for the Chelomei's LK-1 crewed circumlunar spacecraft of the 1960s. It was also the basis for Chelomei's LK-700 Lunar Lander crew capsule. The VA looked somewhat similar to the Apollo capsule, but was 30% smaller than its NASA counterpart.

TKS FGB 

The FGB was entered from the VA spacecraft via a short tunnel. At the aft end a pilot station was equipped with controls and windows for manual docking with the Almaz space station. The docking port was also located here. Operational TKS spacecraft would have delivered KSI film return capsules to Almaz stations. These would have been stored around the docking port for transfer to the film capsule airlock for loading.

Details

Missions

VA spacecraft test flights

Four flights with eight VA spacecraft without an FGB module were conducted to speed up the development of the TKS spacecraft:
 Orbital test of a pair of two VA spacecraft Kosmos 881 and Kosmos 882 in 1976-12-15 that started jointly and reentered on the same day.
 VA #009L/P and VA #009P/P: Launched on 1977-08-04. Launch vehicle failure forty seconds into the flight on a suborbital test of two VA spacecraft. VA #009L/P is destroyed in the resulting booster explosion, VA #009P/P is rescued by the Proton SAS abort system and is recovered safely.
 On 1978-03-30 pair of two VA spacecraft Kosmos 997 and Kosmos 998 started jointly and reentered separately
 On 1979-05-23 pair of two VA spacecraft Kosmos 1100 and Kosmos 1101 that started jointly and reentered separately

TKS-1 (Kosmos 929) 

Kosmos 929 was the first flight of a "complete" TKS spacecraft (VA spacecraft with FGB), launched on 17 July 1977 – it was a "solo" test flight and was not destined for a Salyut space station. The VA capsule returned to Earth 16 August 1977. The remainder of the spacecraft – the FGB – deorbited on 2 February 1978.

TKS-2 (Kosmos 1267) 

On 25 April 1981, TKS-2 was launched uncrewed as Kosmos 1267, the first FGB to dock with a space station. After separation and recovery of the VA capsule on 24 May 1981, the FGB docked on 19 June with Salyut 6, after 57 days of autonomous flight. It remained attached to the station until both deorbited and were destroyed on 29 July 1982.

TKS-3 (Kosmos 1443) 

On 2 March 1983, TKS-3 was launched uncrewed as Kosmos 1443. This time, the VA remained attached and the first "complete" TKS docked to Salyut 7 two days after launch. TKS-3 separated from the station on 14 August. After undocking, the FGB and the VA spacecraft separated and the VA spacecraft continued in space for four more days demonstrating autonomous flight, before the VA capsule successfully re-entered on 23 August 1983, landing 100 km south-east of Aralsk and returning 350 kg of material from the station. The FGB deorbited itself on 19 September 1983.

TKS-4 (Kosmos 1686) 

TKS-4 was launched uncrewed as Kosmos 1686 on 27 September 1985. The landing systems, ECS, seats, and crewed controls were removed from the VA spacecraft, and instead other payload was installed: a high-resolution photo apparatus, an infrared telescope and the Ozon spectrometer. The TKS successfully docked with Salyut 7.

The "military" long-duration crew Salyut 7 EO-4, consisting of Viktor Savinykh, Alexander Volkov and the commander Vladimir Vasyutin, had crewed Salyut 7 that month to conduct experiments with TKS-4. Commander Vasyutin fell ill soon after arriving at the station.
Originally scheduled to have a six-month stay aboard Salyut 7, Vasyutin's illness forced the crew to make an emergency return to Earth on 21 November 1985, preventing the crew from finishing the TKS experiments.
The crew of Soyuz T-15 returned to Salyut 7 in May 1986, to conclude some of the experiments and ferry equipment to the then new Mir space station.

Salyut 7 was moved to a higher orbit after that mission, while awaiting another "TKS" crew – there were even plans to return using the Buran shuttle. Such flights never materialized before Salyut 7 and Kosmos 1686 deorbited on 7 February 1991, burning up together over Argentina.

Further usage 

The TKS design, which has never been flown crewed, has gone on to provide the basic structure for several later space-station components, such as:
 Kvant-1 tug
 Kvant-2 Mir module
 Kristall Mir module
 Spektr Mir module
 Priroda Mir module
 Polyus (FGB) spacecraft
 Zarya (FGB-1) ISS module
 Russian Research Module (FGB-2) ISS module (canceled)
 Nauka (FGB-2) ISS module

Two TKS/Almaz VA capsules were bought for commercial use by the private spaceflight company Excalibur Almaz. As of 2014, one of those were auctioned for 1 million euro, and the other was reportedly shipped away from the company's headquarters on Isle of Man in an undisclosed direction.

Existing hardware
Some VA capsules are on display in museums or in storage.

Known articles include:
 #103/1 – Memorial Museum of Cosmonautics
 #103/2 – Excalibur Almaz
 #103/4 – Smithsonian Museum
 #009A/2 – Excalibur Almaz
 #009/2 – NPO Mashinostroyeniya
 #009/3 – Excalibur Almaz
 #? – International Space University, Strasbourg
 #? – Yevpatoria
 #? – NPO Energomash
 #? – Khrunichev State Research and Production Space Center
 #? – Vladimir Tchelomey School, Kazakhstan

Gallery 
TKS-based and descendant spacecraft and modules.

See also 
 Big Gemini – Proposed U.S. equivalent to the TKS spacecraft
 Manned Orbiting Laboratory – U.S. Air Force equivalent to Almaz space station

References

Further reading 
 RussianSpaceWeb.com: OPS-4 space station

External links 

 TKS at Encyclopedia Astronautica
 http://www.russianspaceweb.com/tks.html

Cargo spacecraft
Crewed space program of the Soviet Union
Space weapons
Almaz program
Salyut program
Reconnaissance satellites of the Soviet Union